Lewis "Llew"/"Lew" John Llewellyn (6 November 1881 – 1 February 1931) was a Welsh rugby union and professional rugby league footballer who played in the 1900s and 1910s.

Background
Lewis Llewellyn  was born in Newport, Wales, and he died aged 50 in Newport, Wales.

International honours
Lewis Llewellyn won 4 caps for Wales (RL) in 1910–1912 while at Ebbw Vale.

References

External links
Statistics at blackandambers.co.uk
Statistics at wigan.rlfans.com
Wakefield Trinity v Ebbw Vale 1910

1881 births
1931 deaths
Ebbw Vale RLFC players
Newport RFC players
Rugby league players from Newport, Wales
Rugby league wingers
Rugby union centres
Rugby union players from Newport, Wales
Wales national rugby league team players
Welsh rugby league players
Welsh rugby union players
Wigan Warriors players